Arthur Burghardt (born August 29, 1947) is an American retired actor, best known for portraying Jack Scott on the soap opera One Life to Live. In animation, he's known for lending his deep bass voice as Devastator in The Transformers, Destro, Stalker and Iceberg in G. I. Joe and Pete (as the character's first and so far only black performer) in several Disney video games.

Career
His first movie appearance was as the Great Ahmed Kahn in Network (1976). Notable voice roles include Destro in the animated series G.I. Joe and Devastator on The Transformers. He also lent his deep bass voice to Venom in Ultimate Spider-Man. and Turbo in Challenge of the Gobots. Burghardt appeared in the series premiere of the short-lived 1991 sitcom Good Sports with Ryan O'Neal and Farrah Fawcett. In 1997, he was the voice of "Cy" in the family science fiction movie Star Kid and portrayed Laurant in the 2001 TV series Los Luchadores.

Burghardt played a commando in the early-1990s video game Night Trap. In Warcraft III: Reign of Chaos, he lent his distinctive bass voice as Mannoroth and Grom Hellscream in 2002, and later in World of Warcraft: Cataclysm he reprised his role as Mannoroth. In 2010 he lent his powerful bass voice as Thanatos in God of War: Ghost of Sparta and afterwards retired that year.

The fictional Arthur Burghardt Expressway in the 8th season Seinfeld episode, "The Pothole", is named after Burghardt.

In 2016, Arthur Burghardt joined the convention circuit with his representative CelebWorx. He appeared at Long Beach Comic Con.

Filmography

Film

Television

Video games

References

External links

1947 births
Living people
African-American male actors
American male film actors
American male soap opera actors
American male stage actors
American male television actors
American male voice actors
Male actors from New York City
21st-century African-American people
20th-century African-American people